The 2007 Copa Libertadores Finals was a two-legged football match-up to determine the 2007 Copa Libertadores champion. The series was contested between Argentine club Boca Juniors and Brazilian club Grêmio. The first leg of the tie was played on June 13 at Boca Juniors' home field, La Bombonera, with the second leg played on June 20 at Gremio's Estádio Olímpico. Boca Juniors won the series 5–0 on aggregate, achieving their sixth Copa Libertadores title.

Qualified teams

Venues

Route to the finals

Final summary

First leg

Second leg

Aftermath 

With this appearance in the last stage Boca Juniors achieved a record-tie 9 times in the finals, winning five of the seven previous occasions. At that moment only Peñarol of Uruguay had played that number of finals. The media praised Juan Román Riquelme's performance in the finals, crediting him as Boca Juniors' most notable player. Riquelme had returned to Boca Juniors after a frustrating experience in Spanish club Villarreal where manager Manuel Pellegrini excluded him from the senior squad due to personal disputes. Under the guidance of manager Miguel Ángel Russo, Riquelme was the top scorer of the team (and second of the 2007 edition behind Salvador Cabañas with 8 goals in 11 matches, three of them in the finals.

The 5–0 aggregate score remains nowadays as the largest victory in the history of Copa Libertadores' finals.

On the other hand, Grêmio –that had played three finals winning two of them– became the second Brazilian club with most Copa Libertadores finals contested (four until then), just behind of São Paulo who had six.

References

l
l
2007
l
l
Football in Buenos Aires
Final